Roland Jooris (born 22 July 1936) is a Belgian poet and writer on contemporary art. He was born at Wetteren. Jooris graduated as a teacher for secondary education (high school) in Germanic languages and was a teacher at the State Technical Institute in Lokeren.

Bibliography
 Gitaar (1956)
 Bluebird (1958)
 Een konsumptief landschap (1969)
 Laarne (1971)
 More is less (1972)
 Raoul de Keyser (1972) (essay)
 Het vierkant op het einde van de zomer (1974)
 Het museum van de zomer (1974)
 Atelier (1975), interviews
 Bladstil (1977)
 Roger Raveel en Beervelde (1979) (essay)
 Akker (1982)
 Gedichten 1958–1978 (1987)
 Geschilderd of geschreven (?)
 Gekras (2001)
 De contouren van het verstrijken (2008)

Awards
 1976 - Tweejaarlijkse prijs voor poëzie van De Vlaamse Gids
 1979 - Jan Campertprijs for Gedichten 1958–78
 1981 - Prijs van de Vlaamse Provincies

See also

 Flemish literature

Sources
 Roland Jooris (in Dutch)
 Roland Jooris (in Dutch)

1936 births
Living people
Flemish poets
People from Wetteren
20th-century Belgian writers